Hyperorgasmia, is the experience of a significantly larger number of orgasms in a short period of time than what is normal. It has been reported to occur as a side effect of the antidepressant drug, moclobemide.

References

Orgasm
Sexual dysfunctions